Simon Giw D'Ujanga is a Ugandan electrical engineer and politician. He is the current State Minister for Energy in the Ugandan Cabinet. He was appointed to that position on 1 June 2006. In the cabinet reshuffle of 16 February 2009, and that of 27 May 2011, he retained his cabinet post. On account of his ministerial position, he is also an ex-offico Member of Parliament (MP).

Background
He was born in Zombo District, on 24 August 1953.

Education
He holds the degree of Bachelor of Science (BSc) in Electrical Engineering, from Makerere University, Uganda's oldest university, established in 1922. He also holds the degree of Master of Science (MSc) in the same field, from Aston University, in Birmingham, in the United Kingdom. He also holds other professional qualifications and memberships in the field of electrical engineering and law.

Work experience
Simon D'Ujanga served as the Deputy Managing Director of the now defunct Uganda Electricity Board (UEB), the then government-owned electrical utility company, from 1994 until 1997. From 1997 until 1998, he served as the Managing Director of UEB. In 2001, he entered politics, contesting for the parliamentary seat of Okoro County, Nebbi District. He won. He was re-elected in 2006. On 1 June 2006, he was appointed State Minister for Energy, a position that he still holds in 2014. In 2010, "Okoro County" was removed from Nebbi District and renamed the newly created Zombo District. During the 2011 National elections, D'Ujanga lost the primaries to the incumbent MP, Stanley Oribudhou Omwonya, also of the National Resistance Movement political party.

Personal information
Simon D'Ujanga is married. He belongs to the National Resistance Movement political party. He lists aviation, as one of his special interests.

See also
 Parliament of Uganda
 Cabinet of Uganda
 Zombo District

References

External links
 Website of the Parliament of Uganda
 Full Ministerial Cabinet List, May 2011

1953 births
Living people
People from Zombo District
Makerere University alumni
Alumni of Aston University
Ugandan electrical engineers
National Resistance Movement politicians
Members of the Parliament of Uganda
Government ministers of Uganda
People from West Nile sub-region
21st-century Ugandan politicians